FabJob is a book publisher based in Calgary, Canada, and Seattle, the United States. It was founded in 1999 by sisters Tag and Catherine Goulet.

History

The company's guide books initially began as electronic titles in e-Book and CD-ROM formats. Since then, a number of their titles have been published in print, though the majority of their books remain available as PDF e-Books. FabJob guides range from 240 to 360 pages of searchable information about how to get started in a specific dream career. Each guide includes information about: how to do the job, how to get experience, how to get hired, how to start a business, how to set your fees or prices, and how to get clients or customers.

Each book contains advice and information from individuals in a particular field, such as athletes, actors, authors and business people.

Books

FabJob has published more than 100 books on careers topics including the following titles:
 FabJob Guide to Become an Accessories Store Owner
 FabJob Guide to Become an Actor
 FabJob Guide to Become an Advertising Copywriter
 FabJob Guide to Become an Antiques Shop Owner
 FabJob Guide to Become an Archaeologist
 FabJob Guide to Become an Art Curator

Accolades

FabJob has been named the number one place to get published online by Writer's Digest and has received an EPPIE Award for excellence in electronic publishing.

FabJob has received press coverage from Woman's Day Magazine and Entrepreneur.com amongst other titles, and the company has been profiled by CityTV in Toronto. Founders Tag Goulet and Catherine Goulet have also written for Metro News and The Calgary Sun about careers topics on behalf of the company.

The FabJob book Dream Careers by Tag and Catherine Goulet ranked #1 in career and business books on Amazon when it was released.

In popular culture

FabJob was featured in the 2005 movie Bewitched starring Nicole Kidman and Will Ferrell. The set decorating coordinator for the movie contacted FabJob to provide some print books, including a fake one called "The FabJob Guide to Becoming a Witch or Warlock", and large cardboard book displays. These props were subsequently used in a scene where main character Samantha Stephens was looking for inspiration in a bookstore to guide her towards a new career.

References

Book publishing companies of Canada
Publishing companies established in 1999
1999 establishments in Alberta
Goulet family